Heini Bock (born 28 December 1981 in Oranjemund) is a Namibian rugby union scrum-half. He is a member of the Namibia national rugby union team and participated with the squad at the 2007 Rugby World Cup.

References

1981 births
Living people
People from ǁKaras Region
Rugby union scrum-halves
Namibian rugby union players
Namibia international rugby union players